Master and Man is a 1934 British comedy film directed by John Harlow.

Plot
Two tramps come to the rescue of a lady by saving her house from arsonists.

Cast
 Wallace Lupino ... Wally
 Barry Lupino ... Barry
 Gus McNaughton ... Blackmailer
 Faith Bennett ... Lady Sinden
 Syd Crossley ... Coffee Stall Keeper
 Hal Gordon ... Gamekeeper
 Harry Terry ... Tiny
 George Humphries ... Slim

References

External links

1934 films
Films shot at Welwyn Studios
Films directed by John Harlow
1934 comedy films
British comedy films
British black-and-white films
1930s English-language films
1930s British films